Rafiq Nishonovich Nishonov (Cyrillic ;  Rafik Nishanovich Nishanov; 15 January 1926 – 11 January 2023) was the thirteenth First Secretary of the Communist Party of the Uzbek SSR.

Life and career
Nishonov held this position for 17 months, from 12 January 1988 to 23 June 1989. His replacement was Islam Karimov. Prior to that, he also served as the Chairman of the Presidium of the Supreme Soviet of the Uzbek SSR between 1986 and 1988. He was also Chairman of the Soviet of Nationalities from 1989 to 1991.

From 1970 to 1978, he served as Ambassador Extraordinary and Plenipotentiary to Sri Lanka and the Maldives. Sergey Lavrov, who has since 2004 served as the Foreign Minister of Russia, served as his Sinhala interpreter.

Like many other leaders in the Uzbek SSR, he strongly opposed allowing Crimean Tatars the right of return and rebuked them for wanting to return to Crimea, even saying that Crimean Tatars who want to leave the Uzbek SSR should find "their place" in faraway Kazan.

Nishonov died on 11 January 2023, 4 days before his 97th birthday.

References 

1926 births
2023 deaths
People from Tashkent Region
Party leaders of the Soviet Union
Soviet diplomats
First Secretaries of the Communist Party of Uzbekistan
Heads of state of Uzbekistan
Foreign Ministers of Uzbekistan
Communist Party of Uzbekistan politicians
Recipients of the Order of Alexander Nevsky
Recipients of the Order of Honour (Russia)
Recipients of the Order of Lenin
Recipients of the Order of the Red Banner of Labour
Chairmen of the Soviet of Nationalities
Seventh convocation members of the Supreme Soviet of the Soviet Union
Eleventh convocation members of the Supreme Soviet of the Soviet Union
Ambassadors of the Soviet Union to Jordan